LIRS may refer to:
 Local Internet registries
 Last modified Information Relaying Specification a Web feed formats